Standley Chasm is a geological formation located west of Alice Springs in the Northern Territory. It lies within the West MacDonnell National Park. The Western Arrernte Aboriginal people are its original owners; it is traditionally known as Angkerle Atwatye, meaning the Gap of Water. Standley Chasm is located in a reserve privately owned by the Iwupataka Land Trust.

The first European name for the formation was Gall Springs but it was renamed Standley Chasm in honour of Ida Standley, the first school teacher in Alice Springs.

The chasm is generally in shade for most of the day, but changes colour around noon when the sun is directly overhead, making this the most popular time of the day to visit.

References 

Landforms of the Northern Territory